Alcester is a city in northern Union County, South Dakota, United States. It is part of the Sioux City, IA–NE–SD Metropolitan Statistical Area. The population was 820 at the 2020 census.

History
Alcester was platted in 1879; early variant names were Linia and Irene. The present name honors Colonel Alcester of the British army. The weekly Alcester Union newspaper began publishing in 1888.

Geography

Demographics

2010 census
As of the census of 2010, there were 807 people, 352 households, and 218 families residing in the city. The racial makeup of the city was 97.4% White, 0.1% African American, 0.2% Native American, 0.7% Asian, 0.2% from other races, and 1.2% from two or more races. Hispanic or Latino of any race were 1.5% of the population.

There were 352 households, of which 25.6% had children under the age of 18 living with them, 49.4% were married couples living together, 9.9% had a female householder with no husband present, 2.6% had a male householder with no wife present, and 38.1% were non-families. 33.0% of all households were made up of individuals, and 18.8% had someone living alone who was 65 years of age or older. The average household size was 2.16 and the average family size was 2.72.

The median age in the city was 48.8 years. 21.8% of residents were under the age of 18; 3.2% were between the ages of 18 and 24; 20.1% were from 25 to 44; 27.8% were from 45 to 64; and 27.1% were 65 years of age or older. The gender makeup of the city was 47.8% male and 52.2% female.

2000 census
As of the census of 2000, there were 880 people, 388 households, and 233 families residing in the city. The racial makeup of the city was 98.41% White, 0.23% Native American, 0.91% Asian, and 0.45% from two or more races.

There were 388 households, out of which 25.0% had children under the age of 18 living with them, 53.4% were married couples living together, 5.7% had a female householder with no husband present, and 39.7% were non-families. 36.9% of all households were made up of individuals, and 24.7% had someone living alone who was 65 years of age or older. The average household size was 2.10 and the average family size was 2.72.

In the city, the population was spread out, with 18.9% under the age of 18, 5.8% from 18 to 24, 19.9% from 25 to 44, 22.2% from 45 to 64, and 33.3% who were 65 years of age or older. The median age was 48 years. For every 100 females, there were 74.6 males. For every 100 females age 18 and over, there were 71.6 males.

The median income for a household in the city was $29,432, and the median income for a family was $44,286. Males had a median income of $28,047 versus $21,167 for females. The per capita income for the city was $16,593. About 6.5% of families and 7.9% of the population were below the poverty line, including 3.8% of those under the age of 18 and 16.0% of those 65 and older.

Education
Alcester-Hudson High School is the only high school in the Alcester-Hudson School District.

See also
 List of cities in South Dakota

References

External links

 
 Alcester-Hudson School Website

Cities in South Dakota
Cities in Union County, South Dakota
Sioux City metropolitan area